Marmul Airport  is an airport serving the Petroleum Development Oman (PDO) operations at the Marmul heavy oil field in Oman.

The Marmul VOR-DME (Ident: MRL) is located on the field.

See also
Transport in Oman
List of airports in Oman

References

External links
 OurAirports - Marmul Airport
 Marmul - FallingRain

 Google Earth

Airports in Oman